The Conchological Society of Great Britain and Ireland is a British-based society concerned with the study of molluscs and their shells. It was founded in 1876, and is one of the oldest such societies in the world. It is a registered UK charity (no 208205) that anyone can join. It promotes the study of molluscs and their conservation, through meetings, publications, workshops, field meetings, and distribution recording schemes.

Journals
Two periodicals are published by the society:
 Journal of Conchology – a scientific publication issued twice a year
 Mollusc World – the magazine of the Society, previously known as The Conchologists' Newsletter, and issued three times a year

See also
 Netherlands Malacological Society
 Malacological Society of London
 Stella Turk
 Arthur Erskine Ellis

References

External links
 Conchsoc.org: official Conchological Society of Great Britain & Ireland website

Conchological societies
Scientific organisations based in the United Kingdom
Scientific organizations established in 1876
1876 establishments in the United Kingdom
Non-profit organisations based in the United Kingdom